Henry López Báez  (born 3 July 1967, in Montevideo) is a former Uruguayan footballer.

Club career
López Báez spent most of his career playing for Bella Vista in the Primera División Uruguaya. He also had a spell with Talleres in the Primera División de Argentina.

International career
López Báez made eight appearances for the senior Uruguay national football team during 1991.

References

 

1967 births
Living people
Uruguayan footballers
Uruguay international footballers
1991 Copa América players
Uruguayan Primera División players
Argentine Primera División players
C.A. Bella Vista players
Centro Atlético Fénix players
Talleres de Córdoba footballers
Footballers from Montevideo
Expatriate footballers in Argentina
Uruguayan expatriate footballers
Association football midfielders